Trerise is a hamlet in the parish of Grade-Ruan, Cornwall, England, United Kingdom.

References

Hamlets in Cornwall